Paolo Revelli (born 12 April 1959) is an Italian former swimmer who competed in the 1976 Summer Olympics, in the 1980 Summer Olympics, and in the 1984 Summer Olympics.

References

1959 births
Living people
Italian male swimmers
Italian male freestyle swimmers
Italian male butterfly swimmers
Olympic swimmers of Italy
Swimmers at the 1976 Summer Olympics
Swimmers at the 1980 Summer Olympics
Swimmers at the 1984 Summer Olympics
European Aquatics Championships medalists in swimming
Mediterranean Games gold medalists for Italy
Mediterranean Games medalists in swimming
Swimmers at the 1975 Mediterranean Games
Swimmers at the 1979 Mediterranean Games